Victor Lhérie (4 May 1808 – 29 March 1845) was a French librettist and playwright.

Biography 
The son of a jeweler, he was destined to take over from his father when attracted to the theater, he was hired as an actor in Jules and Edmond Seveste's troupes. He made his debut 4 April 1826 at the Théâtre des Variétés in the role of the 
lover of the play France et Savoie then was noted for his comic yard in the role of a waiter in L’École de natation (5 August 1828), which ensured that comedy a strong success. He afterward specialized in the roles of female transvestites.

From 1829, he began writing parodies, often with his brother Léon Lévy Brunswick and Léon Vidal, while continuing his acting career. In 1838 and 1848 he played in Brussels, but on his return went insane

The plays he wrote during his short career were presented in the most famous Parisian theatres of the 19th century including the Théâtre de la Gaité, the Théâtre des Variétés, and the Théâtre des Nouveautés.

Works 
1829: Les Suites d'un mariage de raison, drama in 1 act mingled with couplets, with Armand d'Artois
1830: L'Épée, le bâton et le chausson, comédie en vaudeville in 4 scenes, with Léon de Céran
1830: Mme Lavalette, historical drama in 2 acts, with Mathieu Barthélemy Thouin
1831: Encore un préjugé, ou les Deux éligibles, comédie en vaudevilles in 3 acts, with Amable de Saint-Hilaire and Brunswick
1831 Les Croix et le charivari, à-propos in 1 act, mingled with couplets, with Brunswick and de Céran
1832: L'art de ne pas monter sa garde, vaudeville in 1 act, with Mathieu-Barthélémy Thouin
1832: Le Fossé des Tuileries, revue-vaudeville in 1 act, with Julien de Mallian and Philippe Dumanoir
1832: Le Mort sous le scellé, foly in 1 act, with Thouin and Jérôme-Léon Vidal
1834: La Gueule de lion, comedy in 1 act, mingled with song, with Brunswick
1835: Le Sauveur, comedy in 3 acts, mingled with couplets, with Léon Halévy
1835: Un tissu d'horreurs, vaudeville in 1 act, with Brunswick
1836: Il campanello, one-act melodrama, with Gaetano Donizetti
1836: Crime et mystère, mélodrame manqué, mingled with songs, with Dumersan
1836: Frogères et Loupin, ou le Voyage en Sibérie, vaudeville anecdotique, in 2 acts, with Brunswick
1836: La sonnette de nuit, comédie en vaudevilles in 1 act, with Léon Lévy Brunswick and Mathieu-Barthélémy Thouin
1838: Faublas, comedy in 5 acts, mingled with songs, with Brunswick and Charles Dupeuty

Bibliography 
 Félix Delhasse, Annuaire dramatique de la Belgique, 1845,  Read on line 
 Joseph-Marie Quérard, Charles Louandre, La littérature française contemporaine, vol.5, 1854, (p. 141)
 Victor Fournel, Curiosités théâtrales anciennes et modernes..., 1878, (p. 382)

External links 
 Victor Lhérie on data.bnf.fr

French librettists
19th-century French dramatists and playwrights
Writers from Paris
1808 births
1845 deaths